In geometry, a subset of a Euclidean space, or more generally an affine space over the reals, is convex if, given any two points in the subset, the subset contains the whole line segment that joins them. Equivalently, a convex set or a convex region is a subset that intersects every line into a single line segment (possibly empty).
For example, a solid cube is a convex set, but anything that is hollow or has an indent, for example, a crescent shape, is not convex.

The boundary of a convex set is always a convex curve. It is the smallest convex set containing .

A convex function is a real-valued function defined on an interval with the property that its epigraph (the set of points on or above the graph of the function) is a convex set. Convex minimization is a subfield of optimization that studies the problem of minimizing convex functions over convex sets. The branch of mathematics devoted to the study of properties of convex sets and convex functions is called convex analysis.

The notion of a convex set can be generalized as described below.

Definitions 

Let  be a vector space or an affine space over the real numbers, or, more generally, over some ordered field. This includes Euclidean spaces, which are affine spaces. This implies that convexity (the property of being convex) is invariant under affine transformations. This implies also that a convex set in a real or complex topological vector space is path-connected, thus connected.

A closed convex subset is strictly convex if and only if every one of its boundary points is an extreme point.

A set  is absolutely convex if it is convex and balanced.

Some examples of convex subsets of the Euclidean plane are solid regular polygons, solid triangles, and intersections of solid triangles. Some examples of convex subsets of a Euclidean 3-dimensional space are the Archimedean solids and the Platonic solids. The Kepler-Poinsot polyhedra are examples of non-convex sets.

Non-convex set 
A set that is not convex is called a non-convex set. A polygon that is not a convex polygon is sometimes called a concave polygon, and some sources more generally use the term concave set to mean a non-convex set, but most authorities prohibit this usage.

The complement of a convex set, such as the epigraph of a concave function, is sometimes called a reverse convex set, especially in the context of mathematical optimization.

Properties 

Given  points  in a convex set , and 
nonnegative numbers  such that , the affine combination 

As the definition of a convex set is the case , this property characterizes convex sets.

Intersections and unions 
The collection of convex subsets of a vector space, an affine space, or a Euclidean space  has the following properties:
The empty set and the whole space are convex.
The intersection of any collection of convex sets is convex.
The union of a sequence of convex sets is convex, if they form a non-decreasing chain for inclusion. For this property, the restriction to chains is important, as the union of two convex sets need not be convex.

Closed convex sets 
Closed convex sets are convex sets that contain all their limit points. They can be characterised as the intersections of closed half-spaces (sets of point in space that lie on and to one side of a hyperplane).

From what has just been said, it is clear that such intersections are convex, and they will also be closed sets. To prove the converse, i.e., every closed convex set may be represented as such intersection, one needs the supporting hyperplane theorem in the form that for a given closed convex set  and point  outside it, there is a closed half-space  that contains  and not . The supporting hyperplane theorem is a special case of the Hahn–Banach theorem of functional analysis.

Convex sets and rectangles 
Let  be a convex body in the plane (a convex set whose interior is non-empty). The positive homothety ratio is at most 2 and:

Blaschke-Santaló diagrams 
The set    of all planar convex bodies can be parameterized in terms of the convex body diameter D, its inradius r (the biggest circle contained in the convex body) and its circumradius R (the smallest circle containing the convex body). In fact, this set can be described by the set of inequalities given by

and can be visualized as the image of the function g that maps a convex body to the  point given by (r/R, D/2R). The image of this function is known a (r, D, R) Blachke-Santaló diagram.

Alternatively, the set   can also be parametrized by its width (the smallest distance between any two different parallel support hyperplanes), perimeter and area.

Other properties 
Let X be a topological vector space and  be convex. 
 If  and  then  (where ).
 If  then:
 , and
 , where  is the algebraic interior of C.

Convex hulls and Minkowski sums

Convex hulls 

Every subset  of the vector space is contained within a smallest convex set (called the convex hull of ), namely the intersection of all convex sets containing . The convex-hull operator Conv() has the characteristic properties of a hull operator:
 extensive: ,
 non-decreasing:  implies that , and
 idempotent: .
The convex-hull operation is needed for the set of convex sets to form a lattice, in which the "join" operation is the convex hull of the union of two convex sets

The intersection of any collection of convex sets is itself convex, so the convex subsets of a (real or complex) vector space form a complete lattice.

Minkowski addition 

More generally, the Minkowski sum of a finite family of (non-empty) sets  is  the set  formed by element-wise addition of vectors

For Minkowski addition, the zero set  containing only the zero vector  has special importance: For every non-empty subset S of a vector space

in algebraic terminology,  is the identity element of Minkowski addition (on the collection of non-empty sets).

Convex hulls of Minkowski sums 
Minkowski addition behaves well with respect to the operation of taking convex hulls, as shown by the following proposition:

Let  be subsets of a real vector-space, the convex hull of their Minkowski sum is the Minkowski sum of their convex hulls

This result holds more generally for each finite collection of non-empty sets:

In mathematical terminology, the operations of Minkowski summation and of forming convex hulls are commuting operations.

Minkowski sums of convex sets 
The Minkowski sum of two compact convex sets is compact. The sum of a compact convex set and a closed convex set is closed.

The following famous theorem, proved by Dieudonné in 1966, gives a sufficient condition for the difference of two closed convex subsets to be closed. It uses the concept of a recession cone of a non-empty convex subset S, defined as:

where this set is a convex cone containing  and satisfying . Note that if S is closed and convex then  is closed and for all ,

Theorem (Dieudonné). Let A and B be non-empty, closed, and convex subsets of a locally convex topological vector space such that  is a linear subspace. If A or B is locally compact then A − B is closed.

Generalizations and extensions for convexity 
The notion of convexity in the Euclidean space may be generalized by modifying the definition in some or other aspects. The common name "generalized convexity" is used, because the resulting objects retain certain properties of convex sets.

Star-convex (star-shaped) sets 

Hence a non-empty convex set is always star-convex but a star-convex set is not always convex.

Orthogonal convexity 

An example of generalized convexity is orthogonal convexity.

A set  in the Euclidean space is called orthogonally convex or ortho-convex, if any segment parallel to any of the coordinate axes connecting two points of  lies totally within . It is easy to prove that an intersection of any collection of orthoconvex sets is orthoconvex. Some other properties of convex sets are  valid as well.

Non-Euclidean geometry 
The definition of a convex set and a convex hull extends naturally to geometries which are not Euclidean by defining a geodesically convex set to be one that contains the geodesics joining any two points in the set.

Order topology 
Convexity can be extended for a totally ordered set  endowed with the order topology.

Let .

Convexity spaces 
The notion of convexity may be generalised to other objects, if certain properties of convexity are selected as axioms.

For the ordinary convexity, the first two axioms hold, and the third one is trivial.

For an alternative definition of abstract convexity, more suited to discrete geometry, see the convex geometries associated with antimatroids.

See also 

 Absorbing set
 Bounded set (topological vector space)
 Brouwer fixed-point theorem
 Complex convexity
 Convex hull
 Convex series
 Convex metric space
 Carathéodory's theorem (convex hull)
 Choquet theory
 Helly's theorem
 Holomorphically convex hull
 Integrally-convex set
 John ellipsoid
 Pseudoconvexity
 Radon's theorem
 Shapley–Folkman lemma
 Symmetric set

References

External links

 
 Lectures on Convex Sets, notes by Niels Lauritzen, at Aarhus University, March 2010.

Convex analysis
Convex geometry